Robert Gibbons may refer to:
Robert Gibbons (politician), Ontario political figure
Robert Gibbons (economist), American economist
Robert Gibbons (poet), American poet
Robert Gibbons, murder victim in the Ashland tragedy
Bob Gibbons, basketball talent scout

See also
Robert Gibbon, MP for Canterbury